Indium(III) bromide, (indium tribromide), InBr3, is a chemical compound of indium and bromine. It is a Lewis acid and has been used in organic synthesis.

Structure
It has the same crystal structure as aluminium trichloride, with 6 coordinate indium atoms.  When molten it is dimeric, In2Br6, and it is predominantly dimeric in the gas phase. The dimer has bridging bromine atoms with a structure similar to dimeric aluminium trichloride Al2Cl6.

Preparation and reactions
It is formed by the reaction of indium and bromine.
InBr3 forms complexes with ligands, L, InBr3L, InBr3L2, InBr3L3.

Reaction with indium metal forms lower valent indium bromides, InBr2, In4Br7, In2Br3, In5Br7,  In7Br9, indium(I) bromide.
In refluxing xylene solution InBr3 and In metal react to form InBr2.

References

External links
 Indium tribromide at WebElements

Indium compounds
Bromides
Metal halides